Theodore station is a municipal building and former railway station in Theodore, Saskatchewan, Canada. It was originally built by the Canadian Pacific Railway. The two story station building is of wood construction as is the last remaining station of the Type Nine Canadian Pacific Railway Station design developed by Ralph Benjamin Pratt.  Offices and waiting areas were designed to occupy the ground floor, while the second floor dormers contained the residence for the station master.

Rail service to the town ended in the 1970s, the station building was moved from its original location to the current location in 1974 to be used as a Senior's centor, later turned into the home for the Theodore Historical Museum.

References 

Canadian Pacific Railway stations in Saskatchewan
Railway stations in Canada opened in 1902
Disused railway stations in Canada
History museums in Saskatchewan
Heritage sites in Saskatchewan